is a Japanese chemist.  He is a professor at Nagoya University in the Department of Chemistry, Graduate School of Science, director of Institute of Transformative Bio-Molecules (WPI-ITbM), Nagoya University and the Research Director of the Itami Molecular Nanocarbon Project (JST-ERATO). He received his Ph.D in Engineering from the Department of Synthetic Chemistry and Biological Chemistry from Kyoto University.

Biography 
Ken’ichiro Itami was born in Pennsylvania, United States. After receiving his Ph.D under the supervision of Yoshihiki Ito, he was appointed as an assistant professor in Jun-ichi Yoshida’s lab in Kyoto University. Later in 2005, he was promoted to associate professor in Ryōji Noyori's laboratory in Nagoya University, where he later started his own laboratory in 2008. His research interests include the development of new strategies and methodologies in catalytic molecular synthesis through C–H transformation, rapid synthesis of new bioactive molecules, pharmaceutically relevant molecules and natural products, synthesis and properties of optoelectronic materials and controlled bottom-up synthesis of nanocarbons. In 2017 and 2018, he was selected as a Highly Cited Researcher by Clarivate Analytics.

Academic career

 1990-1994 B.S. in Chemistry, Department of Synthetic Chemistry, Kyoto University (Prof. Hisanobu Ogoshi)
 1994-1998 Ph.D in Chemistry, Department of Synthetic Chemistry and Biological Chemistry, Kyoto University (Prof. Yoshihiko Ito)
 1998-2005 Assistant Professor, Department of Synthetic Chemistry and Biological Chemistry, Kyoto University (Prof. Jun-ichi Yoshida)
 2005-2008 Associate Professor, Research Center of Materials Science, Nagoya University (Prof. Ryōji Noyori)
 2005-2009 PRESTO Researcher, Japan Science and Technology (JST), PRESTO Program
 2008–present Professor, Department of Chemistry, Graduate School of Science, Nagoya University
 2012–present Director, Institute of Transformative Bio-Molecules (WPI-ITbM), Nagoya University
 2013–present Research Director, JST, ERATO, Itami Molecular Nanocarbon Project

Research 
Focusing on connecting molecules to create value, the Itami Group focuses on the development of new catalyst and new reactions for rapid syntheses of functional molecules including small molecules for plant biology and chronobiology, pharmaceuticals, p-conjugated organic materials, and molecular nanocarbons. In 2017, they succeeded in synthesizing the first ‘nanocarbon belt.’

Scientific retractions 
The Itami group retracted a study on graphene nanoribbons after being unable to reproduce a graduate-student researcher's results. As a result of problems associated with several research papers, in 2022 Itami was banned for three years from receiving research support from the Japan Society for the Promotion of Science. As of 2023, the research misconduct has led to three of Itami's research publications being retracted and one other paper receiving an expression of concern. Itami requested retraction of the papers in question once he realized he could not reproduce the results.

Awards 

 2004 Thieme Journal Award
 2005 The Chemical Society of Japan Award for Young Chemists
 2006 Minister Award for Distinguished Young Scientists
 2011 Nozoe Memorial Award for Young Organic Chemists
 2012 German Innocation Award 2012
 2012 Fellow of the Royal Society of Chemistry, UK
 2013 Asian Rising Star Award, Asian Chemical Congress
 2013 Mukaiyama Award
 2014 The JSPS Prize
 2015 Swiss Chemical Society Lectureship Award
 2015 Arthur C. Cope Scholar Award, American Chemical Society
 2016 The Nagase Prize
 2017 The SYNLETT Best Paper Award 2016, Thieme
 2017 The Yomiuri Techno Forum Gold Medal Prize
 2017 The Chinichi Cultural Award
 2018 The Guthikonda Lecturer, Stanford University
 2018 The Netherlands Scholar Award for Supramolecular Chemistry

References

External links 
 Itami Laboratory
 Institute of Transformative Bio-Molecules
 Itami Molecular Nanocarbon Project

Japanese chemists
Kyoto University alumni
Academic staff of Nagoya University
Scientists from Pennsylvania
1971 births
Living people